Dunstan Webb was an Australian actor and director, who was a particular favourite of Australasian Films.

Filmography
In the Last Stride (1916) – actor
The Breaking of the Drought (1920) – actor
The Man from Snowy River (1920) – actor
The Betrayer (1921) – actor
When the Kellys Were Out (1923) – actor
Prehistoric Hayseeds (1923) – actor
The Digger Earl (1924) – actor
Dope (1924) – director
Joe (1924) – actor
The Price (1924) – director
Sunrise (1926) – actor
Tall Timber (1926) – writer, director
For the Term of His Natural Life (1927) – actor
The Grey Glove (1928) – director

References

External links

Dunstan Webb at National Film and Sound Archive

Year of birth missing
Year of death missing
Australian male silent film actors
Australian film directors